The French Open, also known as Roland-Garros, is an annual tennis tournament held over two weeks in May and June. Established in 1891 and played since 1928 on outdoor red clay courts at the Stade Roland Garros in Paris, France, the French Open is (since 1925) one of the four Grand Slam tournaments played each year, the other three being the Australian Open, Wimbledon, and the US Open. Organised by the Fédération Française de Tennis (FFT), the French Open is the second of the four Grand Slam tournaments of the year to be played. In 1968, it was the first Grand Slam tournament to open to non-amateur players.

The winner of the men's singles event receives the Coupe des Mousquetaires, named after The Four Musketeers of French tennis: Jean Borotra, Jacques Brugnon, Henri Cochet, and René Lacoste. The event was not held from 1915 to 1919 because of the First World War and was held unofficially as the Tournoi de France under German occupation from 1941 to 1944, during the Second World War.

Rafael Nadal has won 14 French Open titles which is a record for any player, male or female, in any major tournament. He also holds the record for the most consecutive wins in the Open Era, with five from 2010 to 2014. Max Decugis won eight French Championships prior to the Open Era. In contrast, Rafael Nadal is the oldest champion of the Open Era, who won 2022 French Open at 36 years, two days. French players have won the most French Open men's singles titles, with 38 victories, followed by players from Spain (20) and Australia (11). The current champion is Rafael Nadal who beat Casper Ruud in the 2022 final.

History

The French Open was established in 1891 and was originally known as the French Championships. The tournament was only open to French players or foreign players who were a member of a French club during the first 34 years of its existence. The first winner of the Championship was the British player H. Briggs, a member of Club Stade Français which entitled him to compete. Records show matches were played as the best-of-three sets format until 1902 or 1903, when best-of-five sets was adopted. French players were dominant in the early stages of the tournament, in particular Max Decugis, who won eight titles before the outbreak of the First World War.

Between 1924 and 1932 the title was won by a member of The Four Musketeers. The championship started to attract the best players after it became an international event in 1925, which was won by René Lacoste. France's victory in the 1927 Davis Cup increased interest in the tournament and required a new stadium to be built. Previously the tournament had alternated between Racing Club and La Faisanderie, before the Stade Roland Garros was built in 1928. Henri Cochet won the first tournament at the new venue.

Jack Crawford's victory in 1933 was the first time a foreign player had won the tournament since 1891. Following his victory, no French players won the title up until 1940, when the tournament was suspended following the outbreak of the Second World War. Don Budge's victory in 1938 was notable, as he won all of the Grand Slam tournaments during the year. Though the event was suspended in 1940, it was held unofficially under the guise of the Tournoi de France. Bernard Destremau won the first two events, while Yvon Petra won three from 1942 to 1945. These results are not recognised by the FFT or other major international organisations and are considered unofficial. Marcel Bernard won the first event after the end of the war in 1946; he was the only Frenchman to win the event before the advent of the Open era in 1968.

No one player dominated the event during this period. Only five players, Frank Parker, Jaroslav Drobný, Tony Trabert, Nicola Pietrangeli and Roy Emerson, won multiple titles. The tournament became an Open in 1968, as professional players were allowed to compete with amateurs, previously only amateurs could compete in the Grand Slam tournaments. The tournament, won by Australian Ken Rosewall, was the first Grand Slam tournament to be played in the Open era.

Swede Björn Borg won the majority of the tournaments in the early years of the Open era. He won consecutive titles in 1974 and 1975, before winning four successive titles from 1978 to 1981. Yannick Noah became the first Frenchman to win the event since 1946, when he won in 1983. Ivan Lendl won his first title in 1984, before losing the following year to Wilander in the final and won two consecutive titles in 1986 and 1987. Michael Chang became the youngest man to win the French Open when he beat Stefan Edberg in 1989.

American Jim Courier won consecutive titles in 1991 and 1992 before Spaniard Sergi Bruguera repeated the feat in 1993 and 1994. Gustavo Kuerten won three titles in 1997, 2000 and 2001. 2005 marked Rafael Nadal's first French Open; he won four consecutive titles from 2005 to 2008. Nadal was beaten in the round of 16 of the 2009 tournament by Robin Söderling who lost to Roger Federer in the final. Nadal regained the title in 2010 and defended his crowns in 2011, 2012, 2013, and 2014.  In the 2015 event, he was knocked out in the quarter-finals by Novak Djokovic, who eventually lost in the final to Stan Wawrinka. Nadal would again win four straight titles from 2017 to 2020.

Finals

French Championships

French Open

Statistics

Multiple champions
 Competitions prior to 1925 opened only to French tennis club members and French nationals (denoted in italics).

Champions by country

See also

French Open other competitions
List of French Open women's singles champions
List of French Open men's doubles champions 
List of French Open women's doubles champions
List of French Open mixed doubles champions

Grand Slam men's singles
List of Australian Open men's singles champions
List of Wimbledon gentlemen's singles champions
List of US Open men's singles champions
List of Grand Slam men's singles champions

Other events
French Pro Championship
World Hard Court Championships

Notes

Footnotes
General
 

Specific

Sources
 
 

Men
French Open men's singles champions